Crematogaster chopardi is a species of ant in tribe Crematogastrini. It was described by Bernard in 1950.

References

chopardi
Insects described in 1950